The Chengdu J-10 Vigorous Dragon (NATO reporting name: Firebird), is a medium-weight, single-engine, multirole combat aircraft capable of all-weather operations, configured with a delta wing and canard design, with fly-by-wire flight controls, and produced by the Chengdu Aircraft Corporation (CAC) for the People's Liberation Army Air Force (PLAAF), Pakistan Air Force (PAF) and People's Liberation Army Naval Air Force (PLANAF). The J-10 is mainly designed for air-to-air combat, but can also perform strike missions.

Development 

It was the first Chinese aircraft program to incorporate modern development and acquisition processes. In one departure from the past, the supplier was now responsible directly to the customer; this allowed the PLAAF to communicate its requirements and ensure they were met; previously suppliers were responsible to their managing agency, which could produce products that failed to meet end user requirements. Another difference was the selection of a design through competition, rather than allocating a project to an institute and using whatever design that institute created.

Design proposals were made by the three major aircraft design institutes. Shenyang's proposal was based on its cancelled J-13 with a F-16-like strake-wing. Hongdu's proposal was MiG-23/Su-24-like with variable-sweep wing. Chengdu Aircraft Design Institute's (CADI) proposal was a Saab 37 Viggen-like design based on its cancelled J-9. CADI's proposal was selected in February 1984. The following month, CADI and Chengdu Fighter Factory were formally directed to develop and manufacture the aircraft, respectively. Song Wencong (宋文骢) became chief designer.

The engine was selected during the design proposal stage. Candidates were an improved Woshan WS-6, the WP-15, or a new engine. The new engine, ultimately the Shenyang WS-10, was chosen in 1983.

The State Council and the CMC approved the program in 1986, code-naming it "No. 10 Project". Interest waned in the following years which constrained funding and prolonged development. The Gulf War renewed interest and brought adequate resourcing. Unlike earlier programs, the J-10 avoided crippling requirement creep.

Technical development was slow and difficult. The J-10 represented a higher level of complexity than earlier generations of Chinese aircraft. About 60% of the aircraft required new technology and parts, instead of - according to Chengdu - the usual 30% for new aircraft; the high proportion reflected both requirements and limited domestic capability. Development and modernization of China's aviation industry occurred alongside the J-10; the program was an early Chinese user of digital design, modelling, and testing including computer-aided design (CAD) and computational fluid dynamics. The J-10 was the first Chinese aircraft to make major use of computer-aided design (CAD) for its structural design, allowing the detailed design to be completed in 1994. The hydraulics system was tested with physical models because of limited digital modelling capabilities.

The first J-10 was assembled in June 1997. Lei Qiang flew the first flight on 23 March 1998; Lei was chosen for his experience with modern, foreign, third-generation aircraft. PLA training units received the J-10 ahead of schedule starting in 2003. Weapons tests occurred in the fall of that year. The design was finalized in 2004. Rumors of crashes during flight testing were actually mishaps related to the AL-31 engine.

The J-10 became operational in 2006. It was officially unveiled by the Chinese government in January 2007, when photographs were published by Xinhua News Agency.

The Siberian Aeronautical Research Institute (SibNIA) from Russia was involved in the program by 2016. According to SibNIA, it was only observing and instructing as "scientific guides".

According to the images posted by China National Radio of a PLAAF live-firing exercise at an unspecified location in May 2021, J-10C Vigorous Dragons were equipped with distinctive exhaust nozzles of the WS-10B Taihang turbofan engine. This marks the first time the WS-10 has been officially seen on an operational J-10.

Disputed origins 

In 1988 Israel's defense minister denied a report by the Sunday Times of London that Israel and China had agreed to develop a fighter derived from the IAI Lavi, a project based on the F-16. In 2006, Russia's SibNIA engineers believed that the J-10 was "more or less a version" of the Lavi, incorporating "a melting pot of foreign technology and acquired design methods... but there are a number of other pieces of other aircraft or technologies that are part of the configuration that they have acquired from different sources." In 2008, Janes claimed that the J-10 benefited from technical information from the Israeli project, citing senior Russian engineers who said they had heard this from Chinese colleagues.

The Chinese assert J-10's features claimed to be from the Lavi are from the manufacturer's own previous aircraft design, for example attributing the J-10's Lavi-like double canard configuration to Chengdu's work on the cancelled J-9 of the 1960s and 1970s; this view is supported by Song Wencong, who worked on the J-9 and became the J-10's chief designer, and PLAAF Major General Zhang Weigang.

Design 

The J-10 was designed and developed by the Chengdu Aircraft Design Institute (CADI), a subsidiary of Chengdu Aircraft Corporation.

Airframe 

The airframe is constructed from metal alloys and composite materials for high strength and low weight, the airframe's aerodynamic layout adopts a "tail-less canard delta" wing configuration. A large delta wing is mid-mounted towards the rear of the fuselage, while a pair of canards (or foreplanes) are mounted higher up and towards the front of the fuselage, behind and below the cockpit. This configuration provides very high agility, especially at low speeds, and also reduces stall speed, allowing for a lower airspeed during instrument approaches. A large vertical tail is present on top of the fuselage and small ventral fins underneath the fuselage provide further stability.

On J-10A, a rectangular air intake ramp and a splitter plate are located underneath the fuselage, providing the air supply to the engine. Newer variants, including J-10B and J-10C use a diverterless intake that does not require a splitter plate, and may reduce radar cross signature. Under the fuselage and wings are 11 hardpoints, used for carrying various types of weaponry and drop-tanks containing extra fuel. The retractable undercarriage comprises a steerable pair of nose-wheels underneath the air intake and two main gear wheels towards the rear of the fuselage.

The cockpit is covered by a two-piece bubble canopy providing 360 degrees of visual coverage for the pilot. The canopy lifts upwards to permit cockpit entry and exit. The Controls take the form of a conventional centre stick and a throttle stick located to the left of the pilot. These also incorporate "hands on throttle and stick" (HOTAS) controls. A zero-zero ejection seat is provided for the pilot, permitting safe ejection in an emergency even at zero altitude and zero speed.

Due to the J-10's aerodynamically unstable design, a digital quadruplex-redundant fly-by-wire (FBW) flight control system (FCS) aids the pilot in flying the aircraft. The FCS typically monitors pilot control inputs, preventing the pilot from accidentally exiting the flight envelope from applying too much control input during high performance flight situations. This is critical in canard wing aircraft, as they are capable of turning in a much tighter radius than conventional aircraft. The massive control surfaces are capable of moving so far that they can completely destroy the aircraft in flight at high airspeeds if not kept in check by the FCS.

Avionics 

The cockpit has three liquid crystal (LCD) Multi-function displays (MFD) along with a Chinese developed holographic head-up display (HUD), all of which are fully compatible with a domestic Chinese advanced helmet mounted sight (HMS), claimed by Chinese to be superior to the HMS on the Sukhoi Su-27 sold to China.

Radar 

According to Chengdu Aircraft Industry Corporation officials the J-10 uses a multi-mode fire-control radar designed in China. The radar has a mechanically scanned planar array antenna and is capable of tracking 10 targets. Of the 10 targets tracked, 2 can be engaged simultaneously with semi-active radar homing missiles or 4 can be engaged with active radar homing missiles.

For J-10B, the nose cone is modified to accommodate an active phased array airborne radar (AESA) radar. The general designer of AESA for J-10B is Mr. Zhang Kunhui (张昆辉, 1963 -), the head of 607 Research Institute in Neijiang, Sichuan.  Mr. Zhang Kunhui became the deputy head of 607th Research Institute in 1997, and four years later in 2001, he became the head of the institute, when the AESA program for J-10B started.  The primary contractor of this AESA is the Radar and Electronic Equipment Research Academy of Aviation Industry Corporation of China located in Sichuan, formed in March 2004 by combining the 607th Research Institute and 171st Factory together with Mr. Zhang Kunhui was named as the head of the research academy.  According to Chinese governmental media, the AESA for J-10B took 8 years to develop, finally completed in 2008, and Chinese fighter radars hence achieved a quantum leap in that it went from mechanically scanned planar slotted array directly into AESA, skipping the passive phased array PESA radar. Many suspected the radar is a PESA, but during its brief debuts in the 7th China International Defense Electronics Exhibition (CIDEX) in May 2010 and the 6th International Conference on Radar held in Beijing in Sept 2011, Chinese official sources have claimed it is an AESA.

Propulsion 

The J-10 is powered by a single turbofan. The J-10A entered production with the Russian Salyut AL-31FN. In December 2013, Salyut reported it was testing an upgraded AL-31FN Series 3 for China with 250 hours more life and 1000 kg/f more thrust; the Series 3 would be equipped on the improved J-10B. Compared to the original Lyulka-Saturn AL-31F, the AL-31FN was fitted to the J-10 by rotating the gearbox and accessory pack to the underside.

The J-10s intended engine is the Chinese Shenyang WS-10. The WS-10 suffered development difficulties and production of the aircraft went ahead with the Salyut AL-31FN as a substitute. A pre-production J-10C flew with a WS-10 at the 2018 China International Aviation & Aerospace Exhibition; the engine nozzle was modified for stealth and thrust vectoring (TVC). In March 2020, a video from Chinese state media showed a J-10C in PLAAF livery equipped with the WS-10B; WS-10B-powered aircraft were in service by November 2021.

Weaponry and external loads 

The aircraft's internal armament consists of a Gryazev-Shipunov GSh-23 twin-barrel cannon, located underneath the port side of the intake.

Air-to-air missiles deployed may include short-range air-to-air missiles such as the PL-8 and PL-10 (on J-10C), medium-range radar-guided air-to-air missiles such as the PL-12 and PL-15 (on J-10C), unguided and precision guided munitions such as laser-guided bombs, air-to-surface missile such as KD-88, anti-ship missiles such as the YJ-91A, and anti-radiation missiles such as the YJ-91.

Operational history

China 

The first aircraft were delivered to the 13th Test Regiment on 23 February 2003. The aircraft was declared 'operational' in December of the same year, after 18 years in development.

The J-10C entered combat service in April 2018.

Pakistan 

The J-10 was offered to Pakistan in 2006 and negotiations persisted into 2012. In September 2020, it was reported that Pakistan was interested in the J-10C. In December 2021, Pakistan announced the purchase of 25 J-10Cs, with an option for 11 more; they were expected to enter service in March 2022. On 4 March 2022, the first batch of 6 PAF J-10Cs landed at PAF Base Minhas (Kamra) after a ferry flight from Chengdu, China. They were officially inducted into the airforce on 11 March 2022.

Exports to other countries 

In 2009, the Aviation Industry Corporation of China (AVIC) planned to offer the J-10 and the CAC/PAC JF-17 Thunder for export. Flightglobal speculated an upgraded J-10B would be offered.

Variants 

 J-10A: Single seat variant. The export designation is F-10A or FC-20.
 J-10AH: Naval version of J-10A.
 J-10S: Tandem-seated trainer variant of J-10A.
 J-10SH: Naval version of J-10S.
 J-10B: An upgraded J-10, initially identified as "Super-10". It features a lighter and stealthier diverterless supersonic inlet, a longer nose radome possibly housing an active electronically scanned array radar, an electro-optic targeting sensor (IRST, and laser rangefinder,) and a new electronic warning or countermeasures pod atop the vertical stabiliser. The aircraft is powered by the AL-31FN M1; one unit was flown with a WS-10A in July 2011 but that engine was not selected for the initial production batch. The aircraft's first flight occurred no later than December 2008.
 J-10B TVC Demonstrator: A prototype fighter based on J-10B that is equipped with WS-10B thrust-vectoring control engine. The fighter has supermaneuverability, capable of performing Cobra maneuver.
 J-10C: An upgraded version of J-10B, it is equipped with an indigenous Active electronically scanned array (AESA) fire-control radar and is equipped with imaging infrared seeker (IIR) PL-10, WS-10B engine and new dual pulse rocket motor PL-15 air-to-air missile (AAM).
 J-10CE: Export version of J-10C.
 J-10D: Electronic warfare variant with straight, protruding spine in the central airframe, containing electronic countermeasure and warfare systems.

Operators 

 
 People's Liberation Army Air Force: 220 J-10A, 55 J-10B, 180+ J-10C, 70 J-10S as of 2021
 People's Liberation Army Naval Air Force: 16 J-10AH, 7 J-10SH as of 2021
 
 Pakistan Air Force: 36 J-10C (14 delivered, 22 on order)

Accidents and incidents 

On 12 November 2016, a August 1st Aerobatics Team training flight suffered a mid-air collision in Hebei. A twin-seat J-10 crashed. The pilot, Captain Yu Xu, and the co-pilot ejected, but Yu was struck by another J-10 and killed. Yu was the first woman certified to fly the J-10.

Specifications (J-10C)

See also

References

Citations

Bibliography

External links 

 AirForceWorld.com J-10 article
 J-10B fighter jet article
  GlobalSecurity.org article on the J-10
 SinoDefence.com J-10 factsheet and pictures
 Chinese Military Aviation at Stormpages.com
 Milavia.com J-10 article and pictures (includes J-10 specifications from Air Forces Monthly magazine)
 SinoDefence.com article on J-10B
 Jane's Defence article on J-10B

Canard aircraft
J-10
Delta-wing aircraft
J-10, Chengdu
Single-engined jet aircraft
Aircraft first flown in 1998
Thrust vectoring for higher maneuverability
Fourth-generation jet fighter